Más Allá del Bien y el Mal (Beyond Good And Evil) (2005) is the twenty-fourth studio album by Mexican rock and blues band El Tri. This is the first album with the recording company Fonovisa after parting ways with WEA. AllMusic gave it a positive review.

Track listing 
All tracks by Alex Lora except where noted.

 "Felicidades" (Congratulations) – 2:58
 "Todos Somos Piratas" (We're all Pirates) – 3:53
 "Politicos Ratas" (Thieving Politicians) – 3:25
 "Juan Pablo II" (John Paul II) – 4:06
 "Queremos Rock" (We Want Rock) – 3:44
 "Ché Guevara" – 4:43
 "De Tripas Corazón" (pluck up courage) (Carvajal, Lora) – 3:16
 "El Peje Atajo" – (Peje's shortcut) – 3:06
 "Sueño Americano" (American Dream) – 5:05
 "Dama de Los Callejones" (Lady of The Alleys) (Lora, Moro) – 3:07
 "Si México Ganara el Mundial" (If Mexico Won The World Cup) – 4:14

Personnel 
 Alex Lora – guitar, vocals, producer, mixing
 Rafael Salgado – harmonic
 Eduardo Chico – guitar
 Oscar Zarate – guitar
 Carlos Valerio – bass
 Chela Lora – backing vocals, Art Direction, Graphic Design
 Ramon Perez – drums

Guest musicians 
 Arnaldo Martinez – percussion
 Carlos Martínez – trombone

Technical 
 Craig Brock – engineer, mastering, mixing
 Raul Durand – production assistant
 Manolo Mendez – assistant
 Eduardo Núñez – assistant
 Alejandra Palacios – clothing
 Ricardo Trabulsi – photography

References

External links 
www.eltri.com.mx
Más Allá del Bien y el Mal at MusicBrainz
[ Más Allá del Bien y el Mal] at AllMusic

El Tri albums
2005 albums